The 2019–20 Belgian Third Amateur Division was the fourth season of the division in its current format. Mid-March all matches were temporarily postponed due to the COVID-19 pandemic in Belgium, only to be canceled permanently two weeks later, with the standing as of March 12th counting as final. As a result, Knokke, Tienen and Francs Borains were crowned champions in their respective league and were each promoted to the 2020–21 Belgian Second Amateur Division.

Team changes

In
 Overijse, Brakel, Turnhout, Heur-Tongeren, City Pirates, Eppegem, Wallonia Walhain and Ciney were all relegated from the 2018–19 Belgian Second Amateur Division.
 Witgoor, Beringen, Ninove and Oostnieuwkerke were promoted as champions of the Flemish Belgian Provincial Leagues, respectively in Antwerp, Limburg, East Flanders and West Flanders.
 Saint-Ghislain, Raeren-Eynatten, Habay and Spy were promoted as champions of the Walloon Belgian Provincial Leagues, respectively in Hainaut, Liège, Luxembourg and Namur.
 Jodoigne was promoted as champion of the French speaking teams in the region matching the old Province of Brabant and Brussels.
 Linden was promoted as champion of the Flemish speaking teams in the region matching the old Province of Brabant and Brussels.
 In the province of Hainaut, Pont-à-Celles-Buzet won the play-offs to fill in the gap left by R.O.C. de Charleroi-Marchienne, which was relegated from the 2018–19 Belgian Second Amateur Division but merged with Châtelet playing in the Belgian First Amateur Division.
 Lochristi was promoted through the interprovincial play-offs on VFV side.
 Gosselies, Kosova Schaerbeek and Rochefort were promoted through the interprovincial play-offs on ACFF side.

Out
 Merelbeke was promoted after winning the 2018–19 Belgian Third Amateur Division A.
 Tienen was promoted after winning the 2018–19 Belgian Third Amateur Division B.
 Namur Fosses was promoted after winning the 2018–19 Belgian Third Amateur Division C.
 Stockay-Warfusée was promoted after winning the 2018–19 Belgian Third Amateur Division D.
 Pepingen-Halle and Zwevezele were promoted as winners of the Third Amateur Division promotion play-offs VFV.
 Onhaye and Verlaine were promoted as winners of the Third Amateur Division promotion play-offs ACFF.
 Givry was also promoted for finishing third in the Third Amateur Division promotion play-offs ACFF as an extra ACFF spot opened up due to the promotion of Visé to the 2019–20 Belgian First Amateur Division.
 Binche, Condruzien, Kampenhout, Leopoldsburg, Longlier, Racing Mechelen, Nijlen, Oostkamp, Stockel, Tamines, Ternesse, Union La Calamine, Wervik and Woluwe-Zaventem were relegated to the Belgian Provincial Leagues.

Belgian Third Amateur Division A

League table

Belgian Third Amateur Division B

League table

Belgian Third Amateur Division C

League table

Belgian Third Amateur Division D

League table

References

Belgian Third Amateur Division
Bel
5
Belgium